Queries per second (QPS) is a measure of the amount of search traffic an information-retrieval system, such as a search engine or a database, receives in one second. The term is used more broadly for any request–response system, where it can more correctly be called requests per second (RPS).

High-traffic systems must be mindful of QPS to know when to scale to handle greater load.

See also 
 Transactions per second

References 

Units of frequency
Information retrieval evaluation